The Rodrigues bulbul (Hypsipetes cowlesi) is an extinct bird which was endemic to the island of Rodrigues, the easternmost of the Mascarene Islands group of the western Indian Ocean. It is known only from subfossil remains collected in 1974.

References

Hypsipetes
Extinct birds of Indian Ocean islands
Fauna of Rodrigues
Birds described in 2015